Turbo Speedway is a 1995 Czech racing video game developed by World Spy Software and published by Space Interactive for DOS compatible operating systems.

It bears no relation to the 1994 German racing game of the same name.

The game, a remake of the 1983 title Rally Speedway was sold for CZK 300. It was the first Czech racing game, and one of two games published by Space Interactive in 1996, along with Oil Empire by 88 Panzer Division. The game made a marginal profit.

The Hrej! newspaper wrote that Turbo Speedway was "one of the most daring [games] that has ever hit stores from Czech production". Score's Petr Slunéčko wrote the game was "characterized by its ugliness and lifelessness" and offered a scathing rating of 1/10.

iDNES commented that the game's only value from a modern perspective is that it illustrates the "spartan conditions in which the development of games took place in our country at that time".

References 

1995 video games
Europe-exclusive video games
Racing video games
DOS games
DOS-only games
Video games developed in the Czech Republic